Vert-le-Grand is a commune in the Essonne department and Île-de-France region of north-central France.

The inhabitants of Vert-le-Grand are known in French as les Grandvertois.

See also
Communes of the Essonne department

Twin town
  Wingham, Kent

References

External links

Official website 

Mayors of Essonne Association 

Communes of Essonne